The Royal Adelaide Golf Club (often referred to as Seaton) is a private Australian golf club located in the Adelaide suburb of Seaton,  northwest of the city centre.

The links at Seaton has been the venue for many international and interstate matches and championships. Royal Adelaide has hosted the Australian Open nine times, most recently in 1998 when Greg Chalmers took home the trophy, carding an even-par 288. The Women's Australian Open was first played at the course in December 1994, won by Annika Sörenstam, and returned in February 2017 where it was won by Jang Ha-na. It has also hosted the Australian Amateur 19 times, the South Australian Open 13 times, and the Adelaide Advertiser Tournament 10 times.

The course record was originally established by American Marty Bohen in 1977. Bohen shot a 63 (−10) during the final round of the 1977 South Australian Open.

Scorecard

Club history
The first golf club in Adelaide was founded  in 1870 by David Murray MP, John Lindsay MP, John Gordon, J. T. Turnbull, George and Joseph Boothby and around 15 others. The Governor, Sir James Fergusson was club patron. An inaugural game of 14 holes (7 holes played twice) was played on the Adelaide Racecourse (later renamed Victoria Racecourse) on 15 May 1870, when Lindsay and John Gordon tied for first place. A nine-hole course was laid out and a greenkeeper appointed, but when Fergusson was recalled in 1873, membership in the Adelaide Golf Club declined and folded around 1876.

Royal Adelaide Golf Club was founded in August 1892 on the North Parklands.  In 1906, the Golf Club was moved to land in Seaton, a northwest suburb of Adelaide. The western boundary along Frederick Road is approximately a mile (1.6 km) east of the shore of Gulf St Vincent.

Tournaments hosted

Australian Open

Women's Australian Open

Other tournaments 
1900 Australian Amateur
1903 Australian Amateur
1910 Australian Amateur
1923 Australian Amateur
1926 Australian Amateur
1929 Australian Amateur
1932 Australian Amateur
1935 Australian Amateur
1939 Australian Amateur
1947 Australian Amateur
1948 Adelaide Advertiser Tournament
1950 Australian Amateur
1950 Adelaide Advertiser Tournament
1952 Adelaide Advertiser Tournament
1953 Adelaide Advertiser Tournament
1954 Australian Amateur
1957 Adelaide Advertiser Tournament
1958 Australian Amateur
1959 Adelaide Advertiser Tournament
1960 South Australian Open
1961 Adelaide Advertiser Tournament
1963 Adelaide Advertiser Tournament
1964 South Australian Open
1965 Adelaide Advertiser Tournament
1967 Adelaide Advertiser Tournament
1968 South Australian Open
1969 Australian Amateur
1975 Australian Amateur
1977 South Australian Open
1981 Australian Amateur
1988–1993 South Australian Open
1992 Australian Amateur
1995 South Australian Open
2004 Australian Amateur
2005 South Australian Open
2006 South Australian Open
2008 Australian Amateur
2008 Eisenhower Trophy

See also
 List of golf clubs granted Royal status
 List of Australian organisations with royal patronage

References

External links

Great Golf Australia – Royal Adelaide Golf Club

Golf clubs and courses in South Australia
Sports venues in Adelaide
Sporting clubs in Adelaide
Organisations based in Australia with royal patronage
Sports venues completed in 1892
1892 establishments in Australia
Royal golf clubs